José Raúl Gutiérrez Parejo (born 30 December 1996), known as Raúl Guti, is a Spanish professional footballer who plays as an attacking midfielder for La Liga club Elche.

Club career
Born in Zaragoza, Guti joined Real Zaragoza's youth setup in 2013, from AD Stadium Casablanca. He made his senior debut with the reserves on 30 August 2015, coming on as a second-half substitute for Sergio Gil in a 0–0 Tercera División home draw against SD Tarazona.

Guti scored his first senior goal on 10 January 2016, in a 5–0 home routing of UD Fraga. On 26 February of the following year, he scored a brace in a 6–0 thrashing of CD Sariñena.

Guti made his professional debut on 10 June 2017, replacing fellow youth graduate Jorge Pombo and scoring his team's only goal in a 2–1 home loss against CD Tenerife in the Segunda División. A regular starter during the 2017–18 season, he scored his first professional goal on 6 January 2018 by netting the equalizer in a 1–1 home draw against FC Barcelona B.

On 20 September 2020, Guti signed a five-year contract with Elche CF, newly promoted to La Liga.

Career statistics

References

External links

1996 births
Living people
Footballers from Zaragoza
Spanish footballers
Association football midfielders
La Liga players
Segunda División players
Segunda División B players
Tercera División players
Real Zaragoza B players
Real Zaragoza players
Elche CF players